Karakilise (Turkish for "black church") may refer to:
 Ağrı, Turkey (Known as Karakilise before 1923)
Karakilise, Şemdinli, Turkey
 Sisian, Armenia
 St. Thaddeus Monastery, Iran

See also
 Karakilisa (disambiguation)